Hernán Avilés (born 4 November 1929) is a Chilean former swimmer. He competed in the men's 100 metre freestyle at the 1952 Summer Olympics.

References

External links
 

1929 births
Possibly living people
Chilean male freestyle swimmers
Olympic swimmers of Chile
Swimmers at the 1952 Summer Olympics
Place of birth missing (living people)
20th-century Chilean people